Robert Edward Folinsbee  (April 16, 1917 – May 1, 2008) was a Canadian geologist, whose work involved geochronology, ore deposits, and meteorites.

Born in Edmonton, Alberta, he received a Bachelor of Science degree in 1938 from the University of Alberta, a Master of Science degree in 1940 and a Ph.D. in 1942 from the University of Minnesota. During World War II, he served with the Royal Canadian Air Force as a pilot.

In 1946, he joined the University of Alberta as an assistant professor. He became an associate professor in 1950 and a full professor in 1955. He retired in 1978 and was appointed professor emeritus. From 1955 to 1969, he was the chairman of the Department of Geology.

He was president of the Geological Society of America (1975–1976) and the Royal Society of Canada (1977–1978).

In 1973, he was made an Officer of the Order of Canada. In 1967, he was awarded the Royal Society of Canada's Willet G. Miller Medal.

The asteroid (187679) Folinsbee is named in his honour.

References

 
 

1917 births
2008 deaths
Canadian Anglicans
20th-century Canadian geologists
Fellows of the Royal Society of Canada
Officers of the Order of Canada
Scientists from Edmonton
University of Alberta alumni
Academic staff of the University of Alberta
University of Minnesota alumni
Presidents of the Geological Society of America